Khezrabad (also Romanized as Kheẕrābād, Khezrābād, and Khizrābād; also known as Kirzrābād) is a village in Takab Rural District, Kuhsorkh County, Razavi Khorasan Province, Iran. At the 2006 census, its population was 274, in 69 families.

References 

Populated places in Kuhsorkh County